Magnotech is a type of biosensor using magnetic nanoparticles to measure target molecules in blood and saliva in a matter of minutes. The technology is based on magnetic nanoparticles that are actuated by magnetic fields.

A cartridge is inserted into a hand-held analyzer. The cartridge is constructed entirely from plastic components, has no moving parts or embedded electronics, and is disposable. It automatically fills itself from a single drop of blood or saliva. Once filled, no other fluid movement is required. The entire assay process within the cartridge is executed by controlled movement of the magnetic nanoparticles, using magnetic fields generated by the hand-held analyzer. The analyzer unit contains the electromagnets, an optical detection system, control electronics, software and the read-out display. Tests have shown that the cardiac marker Troponin I can be measured in blood plasma in around five minutes.

Magnotech was used in the Minicare product of Philips Handheld Diagnostics, which was commercially launched in 2016. In 2018 the technology was spun out into Minicare BV, which was acquired by Siemens Healthineers in July 2019. Magnotech technology is used in Siemens' Atellica VTLi Patient-Side Immunoassay Analyzer, a test for high-sensitivity cardiac troponin I.

The technology behind Magnotech was initiated by Philips Research Fellow, Menno Prins. In 2014 he became full professor at Eindhoven University of Technology.

References

Biosensors
Biotechnology